Adelio Terraroli (24 July 1931 – 5 March 2021) was an Italian politician. He served in the Chamber of Deputies from 1968 to 1979 as a member of the Italian Communist Party. During his time in office, he was present at the Piazza della Loggia bombing in 1973. He also served in the Regional Council of Lombardy.

References

Members of the Chamber of Deputies (Italy)
Italian Communist Party politicians
People from Brescia
1931 births
2021 deaths
Members of the Regional Council of Lombardy